is a former Japanese football player. She played for Japan national team.

Club career
Kuroda was born on May 8, 1969. She played for Prima Ham FC Kunoichi. She was selected Best Eleven in 1991 season.

National team career
On January 12, 1989, when Kuroda was 19 years old, she debuted for Japan national team against Finland. She was a member of Japan for 1991 World Cup. She played at 1989, 1991 AFC Championship, 1990 and 1994 Asian Games. She played 21 games and scored 7 goals for Japan until 1994.

National team statistics

References

External links
 

1969 births
Living people
Place of birth missing (living people)
Japanese women's footballers
Japan women's international footballers
Nadeshiko League players
Iga FC Kunoichi players
Footballers at the 1990 Asian Games
Footballers at the 1994 Asian Games
1991 FIFA Women's World Cup players
Women's association football defenders
Asian Games silver medalists for Japan
Asian Games medalists in football
Medalists at the 1990 Asian Games
Medalists at the 1994 Asian Games